is an independent Japanese film director.

Career
Born in Kanagawa Prefecture, he studied filmmaking at the Osaka University of Arts. His graduation film, NN-891102 (1999) screened at foreign film festivals and was released in theaters in Japan. His Late Bloomer won the Cause and F(X) Dream Digital Award at the Hawaii International Film Festival in 2005.

Filmography

 All You Can Eat
 NN-891102 (1999)
 Late Bloomer aka Osoi Hito (2004)
 Doman Seman  (2009)

References

External links

 Official Late Bloomer Web site

Living people
1975 births
People from Kanagawa Prefecture
Japanese film directors
Osaka University of Arts alumni